The Johns River is an extension of Johns Bay in Lincoln County, Maine. 
It forms part of the border between Bristol and South Bristol.

See also
List of rivers of Maine

References

Maine Streamflow Data from the USGS
Maine Watershed Data From Environmental Protection Agency

Rivers of Lincoln County, Maine
Rivers of Maine